Toto Creek is a stream in the U.S. state of Georgia. It is a tributary to the Chestatee River.

Toto Creek derives its name from Child Toter, a Cherokee chieftain.

References

Rivers of Georgia (U.S. state)
Rivers of Dawson County, Georgia